Lewis John O'Brien (born 14 October 1998) is an English professional footballer who plays as a midfielder for Major League Soccer cub D.C. United, on loan from Premier League club Nottingham Forest.

Career

Huddersfield Town
O'Brien began his career with Huddersfield Town at the age of 11, where he was named Academy Player of the Year for the 2017–18 season. After signing a new three-year contract with Huddersfield in May 2018, he moved on loan to Bradford City in August 2018 for the 2018–19 season. His signing was met with some criticism on social media by Bradford City fans.

He made his professional debut for Bradford City on 8 September 2018, and later that month was praised by manager David Hopkin. By mid-November 2018 he had become a first-team regular. In December 2018 he was praised by City teammates Hope Akpan, and Jack Payne. Later that month, journalist Simon Parker said that O'Brien was "enjoying an outstanding first season in senior football" and was "a driving force in City's push to get out of the League One drop zone". O'Brien stated playing for City had been "fantastic", that he "felt ready for the challenge", and that he was "happy and determined to enjoy the experience".

On 1 January 2019 he scored his first senior goal, in a 3–0 league win at home to Accrington Stanley. In that same match he was later injured and had to be substituted, although the injury was later announced to not be as serious as feared, and he trained in preparation for a league game away at Barnsley on 12 January. In January 2019 it was announced that his loan would continue until the end of the 2018–19 season, after Bradford reached a new deal with parent club Huddersfield. In February 2019, following a poor run of results which saw the club drop to second-bottom in the table, O'Brien spoke about his confidence in the players turning things around. Later that month O'Brien was described by The Guardian as a "smash hit".

In March 2019 new manager Gary Bowyer rested O'Brien from first-team duties, ending "a run of 30 successive league starts" in order to be fully fit for the club's relegation battle. Following a return to first-team action, O'Brien spoke about his experience during his first year as a senior professional. In May 2019 he praised David Ball for helping him develop during his time with Bradford, having previously commended Ball for taking him under his wing.

In July 2019, following the end of his loan spell with Bradford and upon his return to parent club Huddersfield, O'Brien was given an improved three-year contract. He won the EFL Goal of the Month in January 2020. He was Huddersfield Town's 'Player of the Year' for the 2019–20 season.

In August 2020 O'Brien suffered a quad injury and would be out for three-to-four weeks, missing the start of the 2020–21 season. O'Brien remain injured a month later.

He signed a new contract with the club in September 2021. At the end of the 2021–22 season he was linked with a move to the Premier League.

Nottingham Forest
Following Huddersfield's defeat in the 2022 EFL Championship play-off Final, O'Brien, along with his teammate Harry Toffolo, moved to Premier League side Nottingham Forest, who defeated Huddersfield in the aforementioned final.

In January 2023, O'Brien was due to be loaned to Blackburn Rovers, but the transfer was not ratified by the English Football League due to late submission of paperwork. O'Brien was subsequently left out of Nottingham Forest's 25-man Premier League squad for the rest of the season.

In March 2023 he began talks with Major League Soccer team D.C. United for a loan move. A short-term loan deal was signed on 16 March, running until 16 July 2023.

Personal life
O'Brien is a Manchester City fan, and grew up watching the team with his father. During his time with Bradford City, O'Brien used to entertain his teammates by singing.

Career statistics

References

External links
Profile at the Nottingham Forest F.C. website

1998 births
Living people
Sportspeople from Colchester
Footballers from Essex
English footballers
Association football midfielders
Huddersfield Town A.F.C. players
Bradford City A.F.C. players
Nottingham Forest F.C. players
D.C. United players
English Football League players
Premier League players
English expatriate footballers
English expatriates in the United States
Expatriate soccer players in the United States